David Farinango (born 20 October 2000) is an Ecuadorian marathon swimmer. He competed in the 2020 Summer Olympics.

References

2000 births
Living people
Ecuadorian male swimmers
People from Machala
Olympic swimmers of Ecuador
Swimmers at the 2020 Summer Olympics
Pan American Games competitors for Ecuador
Swimmers at the 2019 Pan American Games
21st-century Ecuadorian people